Buttala (බුත්තල) is a town in Sri Lanka. It is located in Monaragala District of Uva Province, Sri Lanka.

History
The history of Buttala goes back to the time of King Dutugamunu in the 2nd century BC, when it was known as Guthala. The Mahavamsa chronicle of ancient Sri Lanka states that when Dutugamunu's army passed through Buttala en route to Rajarata in the north to wage war on Elara. The names of many places are derived from ancient times, often from the names of the generals of armies, as in the case of Buttala.

Industries
Buttala is the home of the largest sugar mill in Sri Lanka, Pelwatte Sugar Industries PLC, which was established in 1981. The company employs approximately 4,200 employees and over 300,000 sugarcane farmers.

References

Populated places in Monaragala District
Populated places in Uva Province